B. K. Dhaon (1901-1968) was an Indian politician. He was elected to the Lok Sabha, the lower house of the Parliament of India from the Lucknow constituency of Uttar Pradesh as a member of the Indian National Congress.

References

External links
 Official biographical sketch in Parliament of India website

1901 births
1968 deaths
Indian National Congress politicians
Lok Sabha members from Uttar Pradesh
India MPs 1962–1967
Politicians from Lucknow
Indian National Congress politicians from Uttar Pradesh